The Hochreichkopf is a mountain in the northwestern part of the Stubai Alps in the Austrian state of Tyrol. Its broad summit lies between the Niederreichjoch and Hochreichjoch cols east of and above the Ötztal valley.

The easiest waymarked route runs from the Schweinfurter Hut to the east taking 3½ hours to get to the top via the Hochreichjoch col (2,912 m). Alternatively the peak may also be ascended from the south. This route was the one taken by the first climbers and runs from Kühtai over the Niederreichscharte to the Hochreichscharte col, where it meets the route coming from the east. For this variation about 4½ hours should be allowed. The crossing of the west flank of the summit between the Niederreichjoch and Hochreichjoch requires sure-footedness.

References

Literature and maps 
 Walter Klier: Stubaier Alpen, Alpine Club Guide,  Bergverlag Rudolf Rother, Munich, 2006, 
 Dieter Seibert: Leichte 3000er, Bruckmann Verlag, Munich, 2001, 
 Alpine Club map, Sheet 31/2, 1:25,000, Stubaier Alpen; Sellrain, 

Stubai Alps
Mountains of Tyrol (state)
Mountains of the Alps
Alpine three-thousanders